The National Union of Metalworkers of South Africa (NUMSA) is the biggest single trade union in South Africa with more than 338,000 members, and prior to its expulsion on 8 November 2014, the largest affiliate of the Congress of South African Trade Unions (COSATU), the country's largest trade union federation.

History
NUMSA was founded in May 1987, with the merger of four unions:

 Metal and Allied Workers' Union
 Motor Industry Combined Workers' Union
 National Automobile and Allied Workers' Union
 United Metal, Mining and Allied Workers of South Africa

The General and Allied Workers' Union and the Transport and General Workers' Union, both affiliated to COSATU, also transferred their members in relevant industries.

The union considers itself to be Marxist-Leninist, and has had a fraught relationship with the South African Communist Party (SACP), which it considers to be no longer adhering to Marxist-Leninist principles. Post-1994, NUMSA became known within the Tripartite Alliance between COSATU, the SACP and the ruling African National Congress (ANC) for its refusal to remain silent on controversial ANC policies, especially its promotion of privatisation and its failure to end mass poverty in the country.

As of 2013, the union has over 340,000 members throughout South Africa.

Rejection of ANC and SACP
At the conclusion on 20 December 2013 of a special national congress held in Boksburg, NUMSA withdrew support from the ANC and SACP altogether, and called for an alternative movement of the working class. The union stated that it would not endorse any political party in the 2014 South African general election, but that individual members were free to campaign for the party of their choice, provided they do so in their own time using their own resources. It called for COSATU to break from the Tripartite Alliance and form a united front of left-wing forces similar to the United Democratic Front (UDF) during the struggle against Apartheid. As part of this, it called a conference for 2014 to explore the possibility of establishing a new workers' socialist party. NUMSA remained a COSATU affiliate until 8 November 2014, although it resolved to cease its R800 000 monthly subscription fee payments to the federation.  In December, 2013 the union also said it would also stop paying contributions to the South African Communist Party (SACP). Up until that time they had been paying the SACP R1-million a year. It has issued a call for the resignation of Jacob Zuma as President of South Africa.

Rejection of the EFF and WASP
The union also distanced itself from Julius Malema and his Economic Freedom Fighters citing concerns about corruption, authoritarianism and a limited conception of anti-capitalism. It has also been critical of the Workers and Socialist Party (WASP).

Expulsion from COSATU
In the early hours of the morning of 8 November 2014, after an "excruciating" 15-hour debate, the delegates of COSATU's Central Executive Committee (CEC) voted 3324 in favour of expelling NUMSA from the trade union federation. After the vote was announced, a row occurred when COSATU president Sdumo Dlamini told the NUMSA CEC delegates to leave the meeting, but general secretary Zwelinzima Vavi intervened, citing the COSATU constitution to argue NUMSA would need to be informed in writing of its expulsion before it became valid. This did not calm matters, with both sides becoming ever more frustrated until the NUMSA delegates walked out and NUMSA secretary general Irvin Jim announced the union's expulsion to journalists waiting outside COSATU House. The meeting was adjourned shortly after without the remaining items on the agenda having been discussed.

The Democratic Left Front (DLF) has stated that NUMSA's expulsion "brings an end to Cosatu as a fighting trade union" and that "Cosatu will degenerate further into essentially a sweetheart and bureaucratised union". Jim has stated that "the fight is not over" and has outlined a strategy of mobilising the union's membership, and the membership of other COSATU unions, to fight its expulsion from COSATU. This may involve court action. He stated that the union will not abandon its plans of launching a united front of left-wing forces to oppose the ANC. Frans Baleni, the general secretary of the National Union of Mineworkers (NUM), meanwhile "pleaded" with NUMSA to apologise to COSATU, but Jim has called Baleni a "hypocrite" who "led the fight against Numsa".

Industrial actions
In October 2021, NUMSA began an indefinite strike, seeking wage increases for its members in the auto industry sector, after talks with employer organisations had stalled. South African plants manufacture for major brands including Ford, BMW and Nissan.

Leadership

General Secretaries
1987: Moses Mayekiso
1993: Enoch Godongwana
1996: Mbuyiselo Ngwenda
1999: Peter Dantjie (acting)
2000: Silumko Nondwangu
2008: Irvin Jim

Presidents
1987: Daniel Dube
1991: Maxwell Xulu
1992: Mthuthuzeli Tom
2008: Cedric Gina
2013: Andrew Nditshe Chirwa

References

External links

Trade unions based in Johannesburg
Trade unions in South Africa
Metal trade unions
World Federation of Trade Unions
Trade unions established in 1987